The 1977 CFL Draft composed of 10 rounds where 106 Canadian football players were chosen from eligible Canadian universities and Canadian players playing in the NCAA. A total of 18 players were selected as territorial exemptions, with the Montreal Alouettes being the only team to make no picks during this stage of the draft. Through a trade with the Calgary Stampeders, the Ottawa Rough Riders selected first overall in the draft.

Territorial exemptions
Calgary Stampeders                           Lawrence Harrison       G                    University of Calgary

Calgary Stampeders                               Larry Leathem           WR                     Calgary

Calgary Stampeders                               John Malinosky          OT                    Michigan State

Toronto Argonauts                            Paul Bennett            DT                    Wilfrid Laurier

Toronto Argonauts                                Mark Bragagnolo         TB                    University of Toronto

British Columbia Lions                       John Blain              OT                    San Jose State

Winnipeg Blue Bombers                        Gary Rosolowich         DB                    Boise State

Winnipeg Blue Bombers                            Lyall Woznesensky       DE                    Simon Fraser

Edmonton Eskimos                             Leon Lyszkiewicz        DT                    University of Alberta

Edmonton Eskimos                                 Dave Salloum            OT                      Alberta

Hamilton Tiger-Cats                          John Kinch              TB                    Youngstown State

Hamilton Tiger-Cats                              Daniel Bovair           DB                       Wilfrid Laurier

Saskatchewan Roughriders                     Lorne Hubick            TB                     Eastern Illinois

Saskatchewan Roughriders                         Preston Young           DB                        Simon Fraser

Ottawa Rough Riders                          Mike Murphy             TB                     University of Ottawa

Ottawa Rough Riders                              Doug McGee              G                      Richmond

Ottawa Rough Riders                              Dan Fournier            WR                     Princeton

Ottawa Rough Riders                              Brian McLaughlin        OT                       Simon Fraser

1st round

2nd round
10. British Columbia Lions                       Robin Adair             WR                       Saskatchewan

11. Toronto Argonauts                            Cliff Pelham            DB                       Dalhousie

12. British Columbia Lions                       Doug Seymour            DT                       Missouri

13. Saskatchewan Roughriders                     John Nelson             FB                    University of Manitoba

14. Montreal Alouettes                           Hector Pothier          DT                    Saint Mary's University (Halifax)

15. Edmonton Eskimos                             J.P. Brescacin          TE                    University of North Dakota

16. Hamilton Tiger-Cats                          John Rothwell           DB                       Waterloo

17. Saskatchewan Roughriders                     Roger Adams             TE                    University of Windsor

18. Ottawa Rough Riders                          Jim Lynn                T                         Windsor

3rd round
19. Calgary Stampeders                           Robin Harber            DB                         Ottawa

20. Toronto Argonauts                            Al MacLean              G                       Bishop's University

21. British Columbia Lions                       Mike Moore              DE                  University of British Columbia

22. Winnipeg Blue Bombers                        Duncan MacKinlay        LB                  University of Western Ontario

23. Calgary Stampeders                           Jim Cotta               WR                     Guelph

24. Edmonton Eskimos                             Dave Beaton             DT                      Simon Fraser

25. Hamilton Tiger-Cats                          Paul Sheridan           DE                      York

26. Saskatchewan Roughriders                     Mike Murphy             LB                      Wilfrid Laurier

27. Ottawa Rough Riders                          Jim McCaffrey           DB                      Richmond

4th round
28. Calgary Stampeders                           Cam Thompson            LB                      Ottawa

29. Toronto Argonauts                            Brian Anderson          C                       Guelph

30. British Columbia Lions                       Glen Leonhard          DT                       Manitoba

31. Winnipeg Blue Bombers                        Jamie Bone             QB                       Western Ontario

32. Montreal Alouettes                           Chris Kotsopoulus      WR                       Toronto

33. Edmonton Eskimos                             Ray Clark              DB                       Simon Fraser

34. Hamilton Tiger-Cats                          Julio Giordani         LB                       Toronto

35. Saskatchewan Roughriders                     Gary Gaska             DB                       Manitoba

36. Ottawa Rough Riders                          Rod Bell               TE              University of New Brunswick

5th round
37. Calgary Stampeders                           Colin Ogilvy           DB                       Simon Fraser

38. Toronto Argonauts                            David Bossey           LB                 Notre Dame

39. British Columbia Lions                       Bob Hogan              TB                       Windsor

40. Winnipeg Blue Bombers                        Jon McCorquindale      TB                       Brigham Young University

41. Montreal Alouettes                           Rocky Treleaven        K                        Minot State

42. Edmonton Eskimos                             Larry Sandre           WR                         Windsor

43. Hamilton Tiger-Cats                          Glen Dawson            K                        Marshall

44. Saskatchewan Roughriders                     Harry Kruger           DB                         Calgary

45. Ottawa Rough Riders                          Roger Wheller          WR                         Acadia

6th round
46. Calgary Stampeders                           Tom Reimer             WR                         British Columbia

47. Toronto Argonauts                            Hugh Fraser            WR                         Ottawa

48. British Columbia Lions                       Nigel Wilson           WR                         Western Ontario

49. Winnipeg Blue Bombers                        Al Bowness             TB                         Manitoba

50. Montreal Alouettes                           Grant Hagerty          G                          Wilfrid Laurier

51. Edmonton Eskimos                             James Duncan           TB                         Queen's

52. Hamilton Tiger-Cats                          Andre Morin            DT                         Ottawa

53. Saskatchewan Roughriders                     Mike Steele            G                          Toronto

54. Ottawa Rough Riders                          Dan Sartor             C                          Ottawa

7th round
55. Calgary Stampeders                           Rick Stinton           LB                         Calgary

56. Toronto Argonauts                            Greg Mosher            DB                         Dalhousie

57. British Columbia Lions                       Terris Davis           G                          Western Ontario

58. Winnipeg Blue Bombers                        Doyle Matheson         DB                         Calgary

59. Montreal Alouettes                           Brian Johnston         DT             Mount Allison University

60. Edmonton Eskimos                             Mike Warbick           WR                          Wilfrid Laurier

61. Hamilton Tiger-Cats                          Bill Rozalowsky        TB                         Western Ontario

62. Hamilton Tiger-Cats                          Terry Tapak            DE                         Acadia

63. Ottawa Rough Riders                          Ross Tripp             TB                         McMaster

8th round
64. Calgary Stampeders                           Dave Langley           QB                         Toronto

65. Toronto Argonauts                            Tom Arnott             DT                         Guelph

66. British Columbia Lions                       Dennis Shaw            G                          Ottawa

67. Winnipeg Blue Bombers                        Peter Capobianco       LB                       Livingston

68. Montreal Alouettes                           Bruce Wilkins          TB                         Bishop's

69. Edmonton Eskimos                             Dale Gullekson         TB                         Alberta

70. Hamilton Tiger-Cats                          Mark Dumont            LB                    St. Francis Xavier University

71. Hamilton Tiger-Cats                          Pat Chemeris           T                           Waterloo

72. Ottawa Rough Riders                          John Harrison          DB                          McMaster

9th round
73. Calgary Stampeders                           Vince Zvonkin          TB                          Waterloo

74. Toronto Argonauts                            Sam Sinopoli           TE                          Toronto

75. British Columbia Lions                       Paul Sheenan           WR                       Western Kentucky

76. Winnipeg Blue Bombers                        Gary Krahn             LB                          North Dakota

77. Montreal Alouettes                           Dave Brescacin         C                           Windsor

78. Edmonton Eskimos                             Lubomir Alexov         DE                          Toronto

79. Hamilton Tiger-Cats                          Jim D'Andrea           DB                          Queen's

80. Hamilton Tiger-Cats                          Dean Lees              LB                          Saint Mary's

81. Ottawa Rough Riders                          Phil Ridley            FB                          St. Francis Xavier

10th round
82. Calgary Stampeders                           Roger Pederson         DT                          Calgary

83. Toronto Argonauts                            John Vernon            LB                          Toronto

84. British Columbia Lions                       Dan Dupuis             TB                          Windsor

85. Winnipeg Blue Bombers                        Wayne Parizeau         QB                          Wilfrid Laurier

86. Montreal Alouettes                           Mark Bohan             WR                          Mount Allison

87. Hamilton Tiger-Cats                          Peter Logan            WR                          Western Ontario

88. Hamilton Tiger-Cats                          James Howard           T                           McMaster

References
Canadian Draft

Canadian College Draft
Cfl Draft, 1977